The electoral district of Euroa is an electoral district of the Victorian Legislative Assembly in Australia. It was created in the redistribution of electoral boundaries in 2013.

It was a new district created due to the abolition of the districts of Seymour, Rodney and Benalla, taking in the areas to the north of these districts toward Shepparton. It includes the towns of Benalla, Violet Town, Euroa, Seymour, Heathcote, Nagambie, Rushworth and other towns in the Campaspe, Strathbogie, Benalla and Mitchell local government areas.

Euroa is estimated to be a safe Nationals seat with a margin of 13.6%. Stephanie Ryan retained it for the Nationals and picked up a small swing in her favour even as the Coalition lost government.

Members

Election results

Graphical summary

External links
 District profile from the Victorian Electoral Commission

References

Euroa, Electoral district of
2014 establishments in Australia
Rural City of Benalla
Shire of Strathbogie
Shire of Mitchell
Shire of Campaspe
City of Greater Bendigo